Zorilla is a striped polecat

Zorilla may also refer to:
Ben Zobrist (born 1981), nicknamed Zorilla

See also 
Zorrilla, a given name and surname (including a list of people)
Zorrilla Theatre, in Tagalog, was a prominent theater in the Philippines